IPC may refer to:

Computing 
 Infrastructure protection centre or information security operations center
 Instructions per cycle or instructions per clock, an aspect of central-processing performance
 Inter-process communication, the sharing of data across multiple and commonly specialized processes
 Industrial PC, is an x86 PC-based computing platform for industrial applications
 IP camera

Education
  or Polytechnical Institute of Coimbra, Portugal
 International Pacific College, Palmerston North, New Zealand
 International People's College, Denmark

Organizations 
 Idaho Power Company, a regulated electrical power utility in the United States
 IPC (electronics), an international trade association for the printed-board and electronics assembly industries
 IPC Healthcare, US healthcare corporation
 Imperial Privy Council, another name for the Privy Council of the United Kingdom
 IPC Systems, a firm providing communication systems for financial markets
 Immigration Policy Center, the research and policy arm of the American Immigration Council
 Indian Pentecostal Church of God, the largest indigenous Pentecostal movement in India
 Intellectual Property Committee, a coalition of US corporations with intellectual property interests
 International Panorama Council, an international network of specialists in the field of panoramas
 International Paralympic Committee, an international non-profit organisation of elite sports for athletes with disabilities
 International Pepper Community, an intergovernmental commodity organization
 International Post Corporation, the International Post Corporation (IPC)
International Presbyterian Church
 International Publishing Company, a former name of TI Media
 IPC Media, another former name of TI Media 
 Iraq Petroleum Company
 Institute Pasteur du Cambodge, a health institute in Cambodia

Other uses
 Infection Prevention and Control
 Indian Penal Code
 Índice de Precios al Consumidor, a Chilean consumer price index
 Indice de Precios y Cotizaciones, an index of the Mexican Stock Exchange 
 Information and Privacy Commissioner of Ontario, an officer of the Legislative Assembly of Ontario in Canada
 Insulation-piercing connector
 International Patent Classification, a classification system
 Integrated Food Security Phase Classification, a tool for improving food security analysis and decision-making
 Integrated pest control, a discipline for combining biological and other pest management strategies
 Mataveri International Airport's IATA code
 International Plumbing Code
 Investigatory Powers Commissioner